Kuntunse is a town near Accra noted for Ghana Space Science and Technology Centre's site for the earth satellite in Ghana.

Location
Kuntunse is on the Nsawam stretch of the main Accra-Kumasi highway.

References

Populated places in the Greater Accra Region
Populated coastal places in Ghana